Johannes Frederik Nicolai Friis-Skotte (1 December 1874 in Vordingborg – 15 December 1946 in Frederiksberg) was a Danish politician and minister. From 1908 to 1924 he was a member of the Frederiksberg district council. He was Minister of Public Works (Transport) from 1924 to 1926 and from 1929 to 1935.

References

Local politicians in Denmark
1874 births
1946 deaths
People from Vordingborg Municipality
Members of the Folketing
Transport ministers of Denmark